Shantell Martin (born October 1, 1980) is a British visual artist, intuitive philosopher, cultural facilitator, teacher, choreographer, songwriter, performer, and more. Best known for her large scale, black-and-white line drawings, she performs many of her drawings for a live audience. Born in Thamesmead, London, Martin lives and works in Los Angeles and New York. Along with exhibitions and commission for museums and galleries, Martin frequently collaborates with international commercial projects, both private and public.

Early years and education 
Martin was born in Thamesmead in South East London and was educated nearby at Bexleyheath School in Bexleyheath. After a year at Camberwell College of Arts, she was admitted to Central Saint Martin's College of Art and Design in London. She graduated with honours in 2003. Martin is half-Nigerian, and identifies as queer.

After graduation, she lived in Japan where she first experimented with live performance art as a visual jockey. From 2006 to 2009, Martin developed her drawing skills through "liveography" — the process of projecting live drawings to sound, music or other experience.

Career 

In 2008, Martin moved to New York. This period marked the next phase of her career, where she began to focus primarily on physical drawing.

Her first solo exhibition, Continuous Line, was held at Black and White Gallery in Williamsburg, New York, and her first solo museum show, ARE YOU YOU, opened at The Museum of Contemporary African Diasporan Arts in Brooklyn. This was followed by Black and White, a collaboration in embroidery with her grandmother, as a part of the Brooklyn Museum group show, Crossing Brooklyn: Art from Bushwick, Bed-Stuy, and Beyond, in 2015. In New York City, she has exhibited at Studio 301, Milk Gallery, Museum of the Moving Image and 3 Howard Street. She has also exhibited at the Bata Shoe Museum in Toronto and the Albright-Knox Art Gallery in Buffalo, New York.

She staged a live drawing installation at the Museum of Modern Art in New York for a private event.

Martin has had residencies at 92nd Street Y's Milton J. Weill Art Gallery, The Cosmopolitan of Las Vegas (in collaboration with Art Production Fund), Summit Series in Utah, Clark College in Washington and Autodesk in San Francisco.

Since 2013, Martin has been adjunct professor at NYU Tisch ITP, a visiting scholar at  MIT Media Lab, and a fellow at Columbia University’s Brown Institute for Media Innovation (at NYU Tisch School of the Arts where she taught the course "Drawing on Everything"). Martin was previously a visiting scholar and research affiliate at MIT Media Lab, Social Computing group (2011–2017). She was a 2018-2019 advisory board member for the Climate Museum in New York and an ambassador for the Global Poverty Project. In 2014, she participated in Sundance Institute's New Frontier. She is also a fellow at the Brown Institute for Media Innovation at Columbia University.

In addition to contributing to a body of work, Martin is a public figure. In 2012, her Bedford-Stuyvesant bedroom and artwork were featured in the New York Times' Home and Garden Section. Her personal style has been documented in Vogue, and The New Yorker created a short video on her creative process in 2014, called "Follow the Pen".

In 2019, Martin was featured in an exhibition at the Denver Art Museum, which showed her iconic black-and-white drawings on the museum's walls, floors and ceilings all over the building. The exhibition explored the concepts of intersectionality, identity and play. Martin's drawings in the museum were swapped in and out throughout the length of the exhibition, making it fluid and different on each visit.

Collaborations 
In 2016, Martin collaborated with Kendrick Lamar for a 75-minute performance at Art Basel in Miami. She worked with Puma for three separate collaborations, PUMA x SHANTELL MARTIN. In 2018, for her third collaboration, Puma staged a pop-up on Canal Street in New York City. She has also collaborated with Tiffany & Co., The North Face, Vespa and 1800 Tequila, as part of the tequila company's "Essential Artists" series.For Kelly Wearstler, she created a mural for the Melrose Avenue boutique and a line of clothing and furniture. She gave a TED talk, “How Drawing Can Set You Free” in June 2021. In March 2022, she appeared with Critical Mass at SXSW to help educate artists on how to successfully navigate brand collaborations.

Commissions 
Martin had a commission in the lobby of the New York City Ballet as part of its annual Art Series. and a permanent mural for Young & Rubicam's Manhattan headquarters. In March 2022, Martin premiered her first choreographed ballet, “KITES,” at the Boston Ballet.

Publications 
WAVE: A Journey Through the Sea of Imagination for the Adventurous Colorist was published by TarcherPerigee as a nine-foot long coloring book with the artist's black-and-white line drawings. The book was created from a series of micro-detailed drawings in a series of 27 notebooks. 

In March 2020, Heni Publishing released Martin's monograph, LINES, charting her prolific career. A 200 limited edition version was included on release with a unique front and back cover drawn by the artist.

References

Further reading

External links 
 

1980 births
Living people
21st-century British women artists
Alumni of Camberwell College of Arts
Alumni of Central Saint Martins
Artists from London
British contemporary artists
British draughtsmen
People from Thamesmead
Shorty Award winners
British LGBT artists